List of Shinto shrines in Kyoto includes many Shinto shrines; but this list encompasses only some of the 400 Shinto shrines with scattered locations throughout the municipality of Kyoto and the prefecture of Kyoto:

The Kamo Shrine predates the founding of Heian-kyō.
 , formally called . 
 , formally called .

Shrines of Heian Kyoto (794–1229)

 .
 .
 .
 .
 .
 .
 .
 .

Shrines of Momoyama Kyoto (1582–1615)

 , also known as

Shrines of Kyoto at peace (1615–1869)

 .  — link to photo of shrine — boars at this shrine
 .
 .
 .

Modern period (1869– present)
 .

See also
 List of Buddhist temples in Kyoto

Notes

References
 Ponsonby-Fane, Richard Arthur Brabazon. (1956).  Kyoto: The Old Capital of Japan, 794-1869. Kyoto: The Ponsonby Memorial Society.
 Tyler, Royall. (1992).  Japanese Nō Dramas. London:  Penguin Classics.

External links
 Kyoto Temples and Shrines
 Photos of Kyoto, with over a hundred temples and shrines

Shinto Shrines
 
Kyoto
 
Shinto shrines in Kyoto
Kyoto, Shinto shrines